Arthur Henry Tobin (born May 22, 1930) is an American lawyer and politician from Quincy, Massachusetts who currently serves as clerk magistrate of the Quincy District Court.

Early life
Tobin was born on May 22, 1930, at Quincy City Hospital. He shared the same hospital room as future political ally James McIntyre, who was born on May 25. Tobin attended Quincy Public Schools, graduating from Quincy High School in 1948 and later graduated from Boston College. After graduation he enlisted in the United States Marine Corps and served during the Korean War. After his military service he graduated from Suffolk Law School and became a lawyer.

Political career
In 1966, Tobin was appointed to the Quincy board of assessors. The following year he was elected to the city council. He remained on the council until 1977 and was the council president from 1970 to 1976. From 1967 to 1971 he was a member of the Massachusetts House of Representatives. He was elected to the Massachusetts Senate in 1971 in a special election to succeed James McIntyre. From 1978 to 1981, Tobin was mayor of Quincy. During his tenure as Mayor, Tobin managed the city during the Blizzard of 1978 and oversaw the construction of the Stop & Shop headquarters in Quincy Center and the National Fire Protection Association headquarters in West Quincy. In 1982, Governor Edward J. King appointed Tobin to the position of clerk magistrate of the Quincy District Court.

Personal life
Tobin is the father of former state representative A. Stephen Tobin and the father-in-law of former Quincy mayor William J. Phelan.

References

1930 births
Boston College alumni
Massachusetts lawyers
Democratic Party Massachusetts state senators
Mayors of Quincy, Massachusetts
Democratic Party members of the Massachusetts House of Representatives
Suffolk University Law School alumni
United States Marines
Living people